Julio Cernuda (24 September 1920 – 25 September 1999) was an Argentine alpine skier. He competed in the men's downhill at the 1948 Winter Olympics.

References

External links
 

1920 births
1999 deaths
Argentine male alpine skiers
Olympic alpine skiers of Argentina
Alpine skiers at the 1948 Winter Olympics
Place of birth missing